The 1932 United States presidential election in Oklahoma took place on November 8, 1932, as part of the 1932 United States presidential election. Voters chose 11 representatives, or electors, to the Electoral College, who voted for president and vice president.

Oklahoma was won in a landslide by Governor Franklin D. Roosevelt (D–New York), running with Speaker John Nance Garner, with 73.30 percent of the popular vote, against incumbent President Herbert Hoover (R–California), running with Vice President Charles Curtis, with 26.70 percent of the popular vote. , this is the only presidential election in which Major County voted for the Democratic candidate as well as the only occasion between 1916 and 1976 that Major County was not the most Republican county in the state. This is also the best Democratic performance in Oklahoma history, and the only election in which the Democratic candidate carried every single county in the state, as well as the first time any candidate won all 77 Oklahoma counties, a feat that has since been repeated 6 times by Republicans.

Results

Results by county

See also
 United States presidential elections in Oklahoma

References

Oklahoma
1932
1932 Oklahoma elections